Samir Brahimi is an Algerian boxer born on 17 May 1990 in Algiers. His amateur career was marked by a bronze medal at the African Championships of Vacoas in 2009 and another in Yaounde in 2011, and a silver medal at the All Africa Games in Maputo in 2011, flyweight category.

At the 2012 Olympics he beat Australian Jackson Woods but lost to Russian Misha Aloyan.

Notes and references 

Flyweight boxers
1990 births
Olympic boxers of Algeria
Boxers at the 2012 Summer Olympics
People from Algiers
Living people
Algerian male boxers
African Games silver medalists for Algeria
African Games medalists in boxing
Competitors at the 2011 All-Africa Games
21st-century Algerian people